Chit Khae Tar A Mhan Par Pae is a 1958 Burmese drama film, directed by Shwe Baw, starring Myint Aung, Phoe Par Gyi and Kyi Kyi Htay. It was the first Burmese coloured feature motion picture with synchronized sound and was introduced to media on June 19, 1958 in Yangon. It was premiered to public on July 4, 1958 in Yangon. It was being released coloured feature motion picture but black and white films were made until early 1990s in Myanmar.

Cast
Myint Aung
Phoe Par Gyi
Kyi Kyi Htay

References

1958 films
1950s Burmese-language films
Burmese drama films
Films shot in Myanmar
1958 drama films